The Tsuutʼina language (formerly known as Sarcee or Sarsi) is spoken by the people of the Tsuutʼina Nation, whose reserve and community is near Calgary, Alberta. It belongs to the Athabaskan language family, which also include the Navajo and Chiricahua of the south, and the Dene Suline and Tłı̨chǫ of the north.

Nomenclature

The name Tsuutʼina comes from the Tsuutʼina self designation Tsúùtʼínà, meaning "many people", "nation tribe", or "people among the beavers". Sarcee is a deprecated exonym from Siksiká.

Phonology

Consonants
The consonants of Tsuutʼina are listed below, with symbols from the standard orthography in brackets:

Vowels

There are four phonemically distinct vowel qualities in Tsuutʼina: /i a ɒ u/, represented〈i a o u〉. While /a/ and /ɒ/ are fairly constant, /i u/ can vary considerably.

Vowels are also distinguished by length and tone, similar to other Athabaskan languages, so that Tsuutʼina, taking the total number of vowel phonemes to 24 (i.e. / ī í ì īː íː ìː ā á à āː áː àː ɒ̄ ɒ́ ɒ̀ ū ú ù ūː úː ùː ɒ̄ː ɒ́ː ɒ̀ː /).
 long vowels are marked with an asterisk, e.g., a* 
 high tone is marked with an acute accent, e.g., á
 low tone is marked with a grave accent, e.g., à
 mid tone is marked with a macron, e.g., ā

Nouns

Nouns in Tsuutʼina are not declined, and most plural nouns are not distinguished from singular nouns. However, kinship terms are distinguished between singular and plural form by adding the suffix -ká (or -kúwá) to the end of the noun or by using the word yìná.

List of nouns

People
Husband - kòlà
Man, human - dìná
Wife - tsʼòyá
Woman - tsʼìkā
grandmother - is’su
grandfather - is’sa
mother - in’na
father - it’ta

Nature
Buffalo, cow - xāní
Cloud - nàkʼús
Dog - tłí(chʼà)
Fire - kù
Mud, dirt - gútłʼìs
Snow - zòs
Water - tú

Words and phrases

my name is (..) - sizi

Noun possession

Nouns can exist in free form or possessed form. When in possessed form, the prefixes listed below can be attached to nouns to show possession. For example, más, "knife", can be affixed with the 1st person prefix to become sìmázàʼ or "my knife". Note that -mázàʼ is the possessed form of the noun.

Some nouns, like más, as shown above, can alternate between free form and possessed form. A few nouns, like zòs, "snow", are never possessed and exist only in free form. Other nouns, such as -tsìʼ, "head", have no free form and must always be possessed.

Typical possession prefixes
1st person - si-
2nd person - ni-
3rd person - mi-
4th person (Athabascan) - ɣi-

Language revitalization
Tsuut'ina is a critically endangered language, with only 150 speakers, 80 of whom speak it as their mother tongue, according to the 2016 Canadian census. The Tsuut'ina Nation has created the Tsuut'ina Gunaha Institute with the intention of creating new fluent speakers. This includes full K-4 immersion education at schools on the Nation and placing stop signs in the Tsuut'ina language at intersections in the Tsuut'ina Nation.

Bibliography
Cook, Eung-Do. (1971a). "Vowels and Tone in Sarcee", Language 47, 164-179.
Cook, Eung-Do. (1971b). "Morphophonemics of Two Sarcee Classifiers", International Journal of American Linguistics 37, 152-155.
Cook, Eung-Do. (1971d). "Sarcee Numerals", Anthropological Linguistics 13, 435-441.
Cook, Eung-Do. (1972). "Sarcee Verb Paradigms", Mercury Series Paper No. 2. Ottawa: National Museum of Man.
Cook, Eung-Do. (1973b). "Complementation in Sarcee". [Unpublished?]
Cook, Eung-Do. (1978b). "The Synchronic and Diachronic Status of Sarcee ɣy", International Journal of American Linguistics 43, 259-268.
Cook, Eung-Do. (1978c). "Palatalizations and Related Rules in Sarcee", in: Linguistic Studies of Native Canada, eds. Cook, E.-D. and Kaye, J. 19-36. Vancouver: University of British Columbia Press.
Cook, Eung-Do. (1978d). "The Verb 'BE' in Sarcee", Amerindia 3, 105-113.
Cook, Eung-Do. (1984). A Sarcee Grammar. Vancouver: University of British Columbia Press. .
Goddard, P. E. (1915). "Sarcee Texts", University of California Publications in American Archaeology and Ethnology 11, 189-277.
Honigmann, J. (1956). "Notes on Sarsi Kin Behavior", Anthropologica 11, 17-38.
Hofer, E. (1973). "Phonological Change in Sarcee". [Unpublished?]
Hofer, E. (1974). "Topics in Sarcee Syntax". M.A. Thesis. The University of Calgary.
Hoijer, H. and Joël, J.. (1963). "Sarcee Nouns", in Studies in the Athabaskan Languages, eds. Hoijer, H. et al., 62-75.
Li, F.-K.. (1930). "A Study of Sarcee Verb Stems", International Journal of American Linguistics 6, 3-27.
Sapir, E. (1924). "Personal Names Among the Sarcee Indians", American Anthropologist n.s. 26, 108-199.
Sapir, E. (1925). "Pitch Accent in Sarcee, An Athabaskan language", Journal de la Société des Américanistes de Paris n.s. 17, 185-205.
Sarcee Culture Program. 1979. Tsu Tʼina and the Buffalo. Calgary.

See also

 Tsuutʼina Nation

References

External links
 The Verb «Be» in Sarcee

Tsuut'ina
Northern Athabaskan languages
Indigenous languages of the North American Plains
First Nations languages in Canada